The 2018 Rose Bowl was a college football bowl game between the Oklahoma Sooners and the Georgia Bulldogs, played on January 1, 2018 at the Rose Bowl stadium in Pasadena, California. The 104th Rose Bowl Game was a semifinal for the College Football Playoff (CFP), matching two of the top four teams selected by the system's selection committee-Georgia of the SEC and Oklahoma of the Big 12. The Georgia Bulldogs won the game 54-48, with a 27-yard run by Sony Michel, shortly after Lorenzo Carter blocked Oklahoma Sooners' field goal attempt in the second overtime. The game lasted four hours and five minutes. Georgia advanced to face the winner of the Sugar Bowl (Alabama) in the 2018 College Football Playoff National Championship game, to be played on January 8, 2018 at Mercedes-Benz Stadium in Atlanta, Georgia. With 26.8 million viewers on ESPN, the game ranked as the fifth most-viewed cable program of all time.

The game was one of the 2017–18 bowl games that concluded the 2017 FBS football season. It was televised on ESPN and ESPN Deportes, and broadcast on ESPN Radio and XM Satellite Radio, with the kickoff at 5 p.m. ET (2 p.m. local time). The Pasadena Tournament of Roses Association organized the game. Sponsored by the Northwestern Mutual financial services organization, the game was officially known as the College Football Playoff Semifinal at the Rose Bowl Game presented by Northwestern Mutual.

Pre-game activities
Pre-game activities were held at the Rose Bowl parking lots and at Brookside Golf Course. The 2017 Rose Bowl Hall of Fame Induction Ceremony was held at the Rose Bowl Stadium Lot K on December 30, 2017 from 12:00 to 1:30 PM. The 2017 Class members were Mack Brown (Texas), Cade McNown (UCLA), Charles Woodson (Michigan) and Dr. Charles West (Washington & Jefferson), represented by his daughter.

Pre-game Rose Parade
The 2018 Rose Parade started at 8:00 a.m. Pacific Time and featured floral floats, marching bands, and equestrian units marching down the 5.5 mile route of the parade down Colorado Boulevard.

The 2018 Rose Parade's theme was “Making A Difference,” and actor Gary Sinise was its Grand Marshal.

Pre-game buildup

Team selection 
In the 2018 Rose Bowl, the #2-ranked Oklahoma Sooners, champions of the Big 12 Conference, faced the #3-ranked Georgia Bulldogs, champions of the Southeastern Conference. This was the first meeting between the University of Georgia and the University of Oklahoma football teams.

Traditionally, the Rose Bowl pits the winners of the Big Ten Conference and Pac-12 Conference. However, any teams may be selected every three years, when the Rose Bowl is a CFP semifinal. The Big 12 and SEC champions traditionally meet in the Sugar Bowl. The 2018 Sugar Bowl was used as the other semifinal this year, allowing any team to be selected.

As a result of Oklahoma and Georgia making it to the Rose Bowl, it was the first time since the 2015 Rose Bowl (CFP Semifinal) that the Big Ten Conference was not featured in the game. It was the first time since the 2011 edition that the Pac-12 Conference was not featured. It was the first time since the 2006 edition (BCS National Championship Game) in which one of the participants was a Power 5 team outside of the two traditional conferences. That same 2006 game was also the last time the Big 12 Conference appeared in the Rose Bowl until 2018. It was also the first time since the 1946 Rose Bowl that an SEC appeared in the game. Lastly, it was the first time since the 2002 edition of the bowl game (also a BCS National Championship Game) that neither the Big Ten Conference nor the Pac-12 Conference was in the Rose Bowl (Nebraska was still in the Big 12 at the time).

The matchups for the semifinals are geographically selected to ensure the top two teams do not play in road environments. More than one team from the same conference may participate in the game, and avoiding rematches is not a selection factor.

Experience in the Rose Bowl 
Georgia won their only previous Rose Bowl appearance when their 1942 team, which claims a national championship, beat the Pacific Coast Conference (predecessor to the Pac-12) champion UCLA 9–0 in 1943, a matchup which occurred prior to the Big Nine-PCC agreement. Oklahoma won their only previous Rose Bowl appearance when their 2002 team beat the then Pac-10 champion Washington State 34–14 in 2003, a matchup which occurred since Big Ten champion Ohio State was selected for the Fiesta Bowl, which was being used as that year's BCS National Championship Game, and Oklahoma was selected to replace them.

Georgia 

Georgia opened the 2017 season as the No. 15 team in both the AP and Coaches Polls. In the season opener, the Georgia Bulldogs faced the Appalachian State Mountaineers. During the first quarter, starting quarterback Jacob Eason was injured in an out-of-bounds hit that strained his knee. Freshman quarterback Jake Fromm replaced Eason. Fromm started as quarterback the rest of the season.

Georgia traveled to its first away and out-of-conference game against the No. 24 Notre Dame Fighting Irish on September 9, 2017. The score was back-and-forth the whole game, until Rodrigo Blankenship scored a field goal with 3:34 to go in the fourth quarter, giving Georgia a 20–19 lead. On 1st-and-10, Georgia linebacker Davin Bellamy sacked quarterback Brandon Wimbush, and forced a fumble, which Georgia's Lorenzo Carter recovered. The Bulldogs held the field, winning the game. The Bulldogs returned home for the next two weeks, beating the Samford Bulldogs 42–14 and the No.17 Mississippi State Bulldogs 31–3.

On September 30, 2017, No. 7 Georgia traveled to Knoxville to play longtime SEC East rival the Tennessee Volunteers after losing to them at home in 2016. The Bulldogs defeated the Volunteers in a 41–0 shutout, which was Tennessee's worst home loss since 1905. The following week, Georgia returned to Tennessee to play the Vanderbilt Commodores, winning 45–14. Undefeated No. 4 Georgia faced the Missouri Tigers back home in Athens, winning 53–28. During that game, Georgia gained 696 total yards, the second-highest in school history. When Georgia faced their biggest rival, the Florida Gators, in the annual neutral-location game, Georgia remained undefeated and beat Florida 42–7, the biggest win in the rivalry since 1982. After Florida's loss to Georgia, they fired head coach Jim McElwain. The following week, Georgia beat the South Carolina Gamecocks 24–10, clinching the SEC East and their spot in the SEC Championship.

On November 11, 2017, Georgia lost to the Auburn Tigers 17–40 in what would be their only loss of the regular season. Georgia wrapped up the regular season by beating the Kentucky Wildcats 42–13 and the Georgia Tech Yellow Jackets 38–7. On December 2, 2017, No.6 Georgia joined No. 4 Auburn in the SEC Championship, the only team who beat them during the regular season. In the rematch, Georgia took the lead in the second quarter when Georgia linebacker Davin Bellamy stripped the ball from Auburn quarterback Jarrett Stidham, recovered by Roquan Smith and leading to Georgia's drive that tied the score. Georgia took the SEC title for the first time since 2005, almost certainly securing their spot in the playoffs.

Oklahoma  

In the 2017 preseason polls, Oklahoma was ranked No. 7 in the AP Poll and No. 8 in the Coaches Poll. Oklahoma opened the season against the University of Texas at El Paso Miners, winning 56–7 and showcasing a strong offense. Next, No. 6 Oklahoma traveled to the No. 2 Ohio State Buckeyes and won 31–16. In Oklahoma's first meeting with the Tulane Green Wave, No. 2 Oklahoma won 56–14. They went on to play the Baylor Bears, eking out an expected blowout but still winning 49–41.

In Oklahoma's big upset of the season, they lost to the Iowa State Cyclones 31–38. They went on to beat the Texas Longhorns 29–24 after Texas recovered from a 20-point deficit. The Sooners also began the next game against the Kansas State Wildcats with a 14-point deficit in the first half, but in a second-half comeback, Rodney Anderson scored a 22-yard touchdown with seven seconds left in the game, winning 42–35. Against the Texas Tech Red Raiders, Mayfield led the team to a 49–27 victory.

Oklahoma met the Oklahoma State Cowboys for their annual rivalry game, and quarterback Baker Mayfield completed 598 yards, winning 62–52. The No. 5 Sooners beat the No. 6 Texas Christian University Horned Frogs 38–20, taking 1st place in the Big 12. In the next away game against the Kansas Jayhawks, Mayfield accounted for his 127th touchdown, breaking Landry Jones's record as completing the most touchdowns in school history, and they won the game 41–3. During the game, Mayfield lost his captaincy for the following game against the West Virginia Mountaineers when he screamed profanity and grabbed his crotch, which he directed at the Kansas sideline. Mayfield's replacement, Kyler Murray, started the game, but Mayfield returned and won 59–31.

On December 2, 2017, No. 2 Oklahoma joined No. 10 TCU in a rematch in the Big 12 Championship, winning 41–17. The game secured Oklahoma's spot in the College Football Playoff semifinals.

Game summary 
Oklahoma scored on five of six possessions in the first half, and they entered halftime leading Georgia by 14 points.

The 54–48 score made this the highest-scoring Rose Bowl, edging out 2017's University of Southern California 52–49 win over Penn State.

First quarter 

After winning the coin toss, Oklahoma elected to defer and kick off. Georgia was forced to punt the ball on the first drive of the game, giving Oklahoma its first possession. Oklahoma's quarterback Baker Mayfield completed three passes, the third to Marquise Brown in the end zone, scoring the first touchdown of the day.

Second quarter 
Sony Michel rushed for a 75-yard touchdown.

At the end of the second quarter, the Sooners employed a double reverse, and Baker Mayfield caught his first pass in college to score a 2-yard touchdown.

Georgia received its possession with only 6 seconds on the clock, and Rodrigo Blankenship scored a 55-yard field goal. Blankenship set a Rose Bowl record for longest field goal kick.

Third quarter 
The Sooners led 31–17 at halftime but the Bulldogs scored fourteen unanswered points in the third quarter.

Fourth quarter 
The game went back and forth in the last quarter. Baker Mayfield threw the first interception of the game, as Dominick Sanders intercepted his pass. Jake Fromm completed a 4-yard pass to Javon Wims, taking the lead for the first time in the game, at 38–31.

Oklahoma tied the game back up, with Dimitri Flowers scoring a touchdown with 8:47 left in the game. Sony Michel fumbled in the next possession, and Oklahoma's Steven Parker recovered the fumble and returned it 46 yards to score a touchdown, putting the Sooners in the lead again.

With fifty-five seconds left in the game, Nick Chubb took a direct snap and rushed for two yards for a game-tying touchdown. Oklahoma did not score on its last drive of regulation game, forcing overtime.

First overtime 

The game went into overtime and was the first Rose Bowl in history to do so. The Sooners won the overtime coin toss and elected to play defense first. The teams traded field goals in the first overtime, sending the game into a second overtime.

Second overtime 

Georgia's Lorenzo Carter blocked Oklahoma kicker Austin Seibert's 27-yard field goal attempt, meaning Georgia would win the game with any points during its possession. When Georgia had the ball, Sony Michel took a direct snap on a second down and rushed for a 27-yard touchdown, winning the game for the Bulldogs.

Scoring summary

Statistics

Rose Bowl records
In this game, five Rose Bowl records were set:

102 combined points scored by both teams is a new record set for the Rose Bowl.  The previous record was 101 points set by Penn State and USC in the 2017 Rose Bowl.
This matchup was the first ever Rose Bowl matchup that featured a team from the Southeastern Conference and a team from the Big 12 Conference, as well as the very first meetup between the Georgia Bulldogs and the Oklahoma Sooners.
This game was the first ever Rose Bowl game in history to go into overtime.
Georgia overcame a 17-point deficit to win the game, the largest deficit to overcome in Rose Bowl history after breaking the previous year's deficit comeback record by USC.
Rodrigo Blankenship set a Rose Bowl record for longest field goal made with a 55-yard field goal kicked in the second quarter.

References

2017–18 NCAA football bowl games
2017–18 College Football Playoff
2018
2018
2018
2018 in sports in California
January 2018 sports events in the United States
21st century in Pasadena, California